Acacia loroloba, commonly known as the Ma Ma Creek wattle, is a species of Acacia native to eastern Australia.

Description
The red or green bark is smooth and will turn grey or brown with age. It has dark brown, black to dark blue coloured glabrous branchlets that are prominently ridged when immature. The tips of the young foliage have a pale yellow or golden colour and are velvety hairs. It mostly blooms between December and March but sometime blooms between July and August usually following rains. It forms simple inflorescences mostly found in the axillary racemes. The spherical flower-heads contain 19 to 23 pale yellow flowers.

Distribution
A. loroloba is endemic to south eastern Queensland and is often situated in the north eastern Darling Downs region from around Haden and Jandowae in the west to Toowoomba in the east and as far north as Durong. It is found in undulating areas on alluvial flats and fertile plains growing in clay or sandy loam soils usually as a part of open forest or woodland communities.

See also
 List of Acacia species

References

loroloba
Fabales of Australia
Flora of Queensland
Plants described in 1970
Taxa named by Mary Tindale